Allah Bux Talpur is a Pakistani politician who was a Member of the Provincial Assembly of Sindh, between 1985 and May 2018.

Early life 
He was born on 17 March 1940 in Badin District.

Political career
He was elected to the Provincial Assembly of Sindh as a candidate of Pakistan Peoples Party (PPP) from Constituency PS-47 (Badin-II) in 1985 Pakistani general election.

He ran for the seat of the Provincial Assembly of Sindh as an independent candidate from Constituency PS-47 (Badin-II) in 1988 Pakistani general election but was unsuccessful. He received 6,769 votes and lost the seat to Bashir Hussain, a candidate of PPP.

He ran for the seat of the Provincial Assembly of Sindh as an independent candidate from Constituency PS-47 (Badin-II) in 1990 Pakistani general election but was unsuccessful. He received 26 votes and lost the seat to Bashir Hussain, a candidate of PPP.

He was re-elected to the Provincial Assembly of Sindh as a candidate of PPP from Constituency PS-47 (Badin-II) in 1993 Pakistani general election. He received 21,095 votes and defeated Syed Ali Bux, a candidate of Pakistan Muslim League (N) (PML-N).

He was re-elected to the Provincial Assembly of Sindh as a candidate of PPP from Constituency PS-47 (Badin-II) in 1997 Pakistani general election. He received 11,965 votes and defeated Mir Manzoor Ahmed, a candidate of Pakistan Peoples Party (Shaheed Bhutto).

He was re-elected to the Provincial Assembly of Sindh as a candidate of PPP from Constituency PS-56 Badin-cum-T.M.Khan-II in 2013 Pakistani general election. He received 35,738 votes and defeated Abdul Razaque, a candidate of Pakistan Muslim League (F) (PML-F).

He was re-elected to Provincial Assembly of Sindh as a candidate of PPP from Constituency PS-71 (Badin-II) in 2018 Pakistani general election.

References

Living people
Sindh MPAs 2013–2018
1940 births
Pakistan People's Party MPAs (Sindh)
Sindh MPAs 1985–1988
Sindh MPAs 1993–1996
Sindh MPAs 1997–1999
Sindh MPAs 2018–2023